There were several Cordeliers Convents in France. This article is about the one in Paris.

The Cordeliers Convent (French: Couvent des Cordeliers) was a convent in Paris, France. It gave its name to the Club of the Cordeliers, which held its first meetings there during the French Revolution.

Cordeliers was the name given in France to the Conventual Franciscans.

The building later housed the Dupuytren Museum of anatomy in connection with the school of medicine. This was moved in 2016.

Burials at the convent
Marie of Brabant, Queen of France
Arthur II, Duke of Brittany
Blanche of France, Infanta of Castile
Joan I of Navarre, Queen of France and Navarre
Marie of Brabant, Queen of France
Joan II, Countess of Burgundy, Queen of France

References

Sources

Buildings and structures in the 6th arrondissement of Paris
Buildings and structures in Paris
Franciscan monasteries in France
Convents in Paris